{{Infobox person
| name          = David Caffrey
| birth_name    = David Caffrey
| birth_date    = 1969
| birth_place   = Greystones, County Wicklow, Ireland
| occupation    = Film director, writer, actor, film producer
| awards        = Fantasporto Critics' Award 1998 Divorcing JackNewport Beach Film Festival Audience Award for Best Feature 2001 On The Nose
}}
David Caffrey is an Irish film director. His most recent film is Grand Theft Parsons starring Johnny Knoxville and Christina Applegate. The film is an account of an urban myth about the death of country rock legend, Gram Parsons.

Filmography

References
Landesman, Cosmo (2004). "Grand Theft Parsons." Sunday Times''. 21 March.

External links
 

Irish film directors
1969 births
Living people
People from Greystones